From List of National Natural Landmarks, these are the National Natural Landmarks in Rhode Island. 

Rhode Island
National Natural Landmarks